The old town hall, on the northeast corner of Scarth Street and 11th Avenue in Regina, Saskatchewan, was converted to the Bijou Theatre in 1908. Hand-cranked silent movies were shown with piano accompaniment. Local amateurs and travelling road shows performed on its rickety, sloping stage. When the Bijou was hauled away in 1909, the Whitmore brothers, A.E. (Bert), George and Dr. Frank, along with Chief Justice J.T. Brown and James Balfour, built the splendid new Regina Theatre which opened February 7, 1910. With 870 seats, including eight boxes, it was able to accommodate the largest travelling vaudeville shows and featured stage plays and concerts.

The Regina Theatre closed in 1929, following a fire. The building remained vacant until 1939 when it was torn down. The Hudson's Bay Company Department Store was built on this site in the late 1960s. The Bay moved to the Cornwall Centre in 2000.

The Regina Theatre even boasted Saskatchewan's first dimmer board, which made possible elaborate lighting effects. This theatre was the city's primary home for live performances presenting everything from drama to vaudeville.

References 

Theatres in Saskatchewan
Demolished buildings and structures in Canada
Buildings and structures demolished in 1939